Karen van der Veen (born 7 January 1966) is a South African hurdler. She competed in the women's 400 metres hurdles at the 1996 Summer Olympics.

References

External links
 

1966 births
Living people
Athletes (track and field) at the 1996 Summer Olympics
South African female hurdlers
Olympic athletes of South Africa
World Athletics Championships athletes for South Africa
Sportspeople from East London, Eastern Cape
African Games medalists in athletics (track and field)
African Games silver medalists for South Africa
Athletes (track and field) at the 1995 All-Africa Games